Donald Joseph Kettler (born November 26, 1944) is an American prelate of the Catholic Church. He served as bishop of the Diocese of St. Cloud from 2013 to 2022. Kettler previously served as bishop of the Diocese of Fairbanks from 2002 to 2013.

Biography

Early life 
Donald Kettler was born on November 26, 1944, in Minneapolis, Minnesota, to Norbert Joseph 'Joe' Kettler and Marguerite Raiche. His family later moved to Sioux Falls, South Dakota, where Kettler and his three siblings (Jim, Beth, and Kathleen) were raised. He received undergraduate and divinity degrees at Saint John's University in Collegeville, Minnesota,

Priesthood 
Kettler was ordained to the priesthood by Bishop Lambert Hoch for the Diocese of Sioux Falls on May 29, 1970. After his ordination, Kettler served as an associate pastor in parishes in Aberdeen, South Dakota, and Sioux Falls. In 1979, he left the parishes to begin coordinating work for the diocesan offices in Sioux Falls. In 1981, Kettler entered the Catholic University of America School of Canon Law in Washington, D.C., obtaining his Licentiate of Canon Law. After returning to South Dakota in 1983, he was named judicial vicar and resumed his work coordinating diocesan offices from 1984 to 1987. During this time, he also began celebrating a weekly televised mass.

After serving as rector of St. Joseph's Cathedral from 1987 to 1995, Kettler served as pastor of St. Lambert Parish from 1995 to 2000, and of Christ the King Parish from 2000 to 2002, all in Sioux Falls. Kettler was also a member of the Sioux Falls Diocesan Finance Council and the Stewardship Committee. He served as a board member for the Catholic Family Services, the Association of Christian Churches of South Dakota and the Sioux Falls Catholic School System.

Bishop of Fairbanks
On June 7, 2002, Kettler was appointed the fourth bishop of the Diocese of Fairbanks by Pope John Paul II. He received his episcopal consecration on August 22, 2002, from Archbishop Roger Schwietz with Bishops Michael Warfel and Robert Carlson serving as co-consecrators. Kettler was the first diocesan priest and non-Jesuit to head the diocese.

After a public announcement three weeks earlier, the diocese filed for Chapter 11 bankruptcy, following unsuccessful negotiations to settle dozens of sexual abuse claims, on March 1, 2008. The diocese became the sixth Catholic diocese in the United States to go bankrupt.

Bishop of St. Cloud
Pope Francis named Kettler as bishop of the Diocese of St. Cloud on September 20, 2013. He was installed as the ninth bishop on November 7, 2013.

On May 26, 2020, it was agreed that the diocese could undergo bankruptcy if $22.5 million was forfeited to compensate 70 sex abuse survivors. The same day, Kettler issued an apology to the sex abuse survivors for the harm they suffered, and said he remained committed to "assist in the healing of all those who have been hurt."

On December 15, 2022, Pope Francis accepted Kettler's resignation as bishop of St. Cloud after surpassing the retirement age of 75.

See also

 Catholic Church hierarchy
 Catholic Church in the United States
 Historical list of the Catholic bishops of the United States
 List of Catholic bishops of the United States
 Lists of patriarchs, archbishops, and bishops

References

External links
Roman Catholic Diocese of Saint Cloud Official Site
Diocese of Fairbanks 
USCCB Office of Media Relations

1944 births
Living people
Catholic University of America alumni
Clergy from Minneapolis
People from Sioux Falls, South Dakota
Roman Catholic bishops of Saint Cloud
Roman Catholic bishops of Fairbanks
21st-century Roman Catholic bishops in the United States
Roman Catholic Diocese of Sioux Falls
Catholics from South Dakota
Catholic University of America School of Canon Law alumni